AHY may refer to:
 Agus Harimurti Yudhoyono, son of former Indonesian President Susilo Bambang Yudhoyono
 Azerbaijan Airlines's ICAO code
ID code for some 2.5 R5 TDI 65-121kW Volkswagen Group diesel engines